Sorrento is a town in Ascension Parish, Louisiana, United States. The population was 1,514 in 2020. It is part of the Baton Rouge metropolitan statistical area.

Geography
Sorrento is located at  (30.180229, -90.866138). According to the United States Census Bureau, the town has a total area of 3.1 square miles (8.1 km), all land.

Demographics

As of the 2020 United States census, there were 1,514 people, 634 households, and 417 families residing in the town.

Education and media

Sorrento Primary School (K-5)

Sorrento is home to River Parishes Community College, established in 1998.

The official journal for the Town of Sorrento is The Gonzales Weekly Citizen.

Notable people

Clay Schexnayder, member of the Louisiana House of Representatives from Ascension Parish, owns an automotive repair business in Sorrento.
John "Hot Rod" Williams, NBA player
Toe Nash, retired MLB player

References

External links
The About Us – History of the College page for River Parishes Community College contains Facts about the Sorrento area, including the town's history.

Towns in Louisiana
Towns in Ascension Parish, Louisiana
Baton Rouge metropolitan area